Fernando Lopes Alcântara ( Fernando; born March 28, 1987 in Salvador, Bahia, Brazil), also known as Fernando Lopes, is a Brazilian professional footballer who currently plays as a central back or a defensive midfielder for Hong Kong Premier League club Rangers (HKG). He is also currently the assistant coach of the club.

Personal life
Fernando Lopes has two elder brothers, Fábio Lopes and Fabrício Alcântara who are both professional footballers and have both played in Hong Kong.

Club career

Hong Kong
Fernando Lopes began his professional career away from his home nation in Hong Kong with South China in the Hong Kong First Division League in 2009. In his short spell at the club, he helped his side win the 2008–09 Hong Kong First Division League and win the runners-up place in the 2009 Hong Kong Community Shield.

Macedonia
After one season in Hong Kong he left for  Europe, to Macedonia, where he signed a two-year contract with Macedonian First League club FK Rabotnički. He helped the Skopje-based club secure the runners-up place in the 2009–10 First Macedonian Football League and win the runners-up place in the 2009–10 Macedonian Football Cup. He made his Macedonian First League debut on 27 September 2009 in a 1–0 loss against FK Teteks and scored his first goal on 16 October 2010 in a 2–0 win over FK Turnovo. He scored 2 goals in 26 appearances in the 2009–10 First Macedonian Football League. He also made 5 appearances in the 2010–11 UEFA Europa League which included a 5–0 home and a 6–0 away wins over Andorran side FC Lusitanos, a 1–0 home win over Armenian side FC Mika and a 2–0 home and a 2–0 away losses against Merseyside club and English giants Liverpool

Back to Brazil
He moved back to Brazil in 2011 and signed a contract with Sport Club do Recife, although he didn't play any matches for the Recife-based club.

Back to Hong Kong
Later the same season, he signed a one-year contract with Sham Shui Po District-based, Sham Shui Po SA who were newly promoted club to the Hong Kong First Division. He made his debut for the newly promoted side in a 5–0 loss against Sun Hei SC. He played in three league matches but couldn't help the side to avoid relegation at the end of the 2011–12 Hong Kong First Division League.

Back to Brazil
In 2012 he again came back to Brazil, this time to Rio de Janeiro where he signed a contract with Bangu Atlético Clube. He made his Campeonato Carioca debut on 5 February 2012 in a 2–1 loss against Americano Futebol Clube and scored his first goal on 15 April 2012 in a 3–0 win over Resende Futebol Clube. He played in 8 Campeonato Carioca matches scoring 1 goal. He signed a short-term contract with Rio Verde in Goiás for the start of 2013, but made no appearances before moving to Rio de Janeiro and signing a six-months contract with Macaé Esporte Futebol Clube in February 2013. He represented the Rio de Janeiro-based club as an unused substitute in 4 matches.

Malta
In August 2013, he returned to Europe, this time to Malta, where he signed a one-year contract with Tarxien-based Tarxien Rainbows F.C. He made his Maltese Premier League debut on 18 August 2013 in a 1–0 loss against Hibernians F.C. and scored his first goal on 22 February 2014 in a 1–1 draw against Vittoriosa Stars F.C. He played in 26 league matches, scoring one goal, and in one Maltese FA Trophy match on 21 January 2014 in a 0–0 draw against Qormi F.C. which his side later lost on penalties.

Oman
In July 2014, he signed a one-year contract with Salalah-based Omani club Dhofar S.C.S.C. Soon after his arrival he helped his to club to win the 2014 Baniyas SC International Tournament as his side won the finals 1-0 against Al-Hidd SCC of Bahraini Premier League, hence helping to win their first title of the 2014–15 season. He made his Oman Professional League debut and scored his first goal on 12 September 2014 in a 1–1 draw against Al-Khaboora SC. He also made his Sultan Qaboos Cup debut on 3 December 2014 in a 2–0 win over Madha SC in the Round of 32. He also made his Oman Professional League Cup debut and scored his first goal in the competition on 13 November 2014 in a 4–0 win over Bowsher Club. He scored 5 goals in 23 appearances in the 2014–15 Oman Professional League. He also scored 1 goal in 8 appearances in the 2014–15 Oman Professional League Cup.

Jordan
He spent the first part of the 2015–16 season with Jordanian Premier League side Al-Ramtha.

Third return to Brazil
In February 2016, he returned again to Brazil, signing for Campeonato Paraibano side Treze Futebol Clube. He made his debut on 6 March in a 1–1 with Sousa Esporte Clube. He went on to make 17 Campeonato Paraibano appearances over two seasons.

On 12 May 2017, he left Treze to sign for CS Sergipe, joining up with former coach Marcelo Vilar to play in 2017 Campeonato Brasileiro Série D. He made his debut on 21 May in a 2–1 defeat to Jacobina Esporte Clube.

Third return to Hong Kong
In the summer of 2018, Fernando Lopes returned once again to Hong Kong. It was confirmed in September by Rangers (HKG) Director of Football Philip Lee that he had joined the club.

After playing for Eastern District in the 2019–20 season, it was announced on 14 October 2020 that Fernando would return to Rangers.

International career
In December 2021, it was reported that Fernando had received a Hong Kong passport. However, he is not eligible to play for Hong Kong internationally.

Career statistics

Club
As at 21 May 2017.

References

External links
 
 Fernando Lopes at TheFinalBall
 
 Profile at HKFA

1987 births
Living people
Sportspeople from Salvador, Bahia
Brazilian footballers
Brazilian expatriate footballers
Association football defenders
South China AA players
Hong Kong Rangers FC players
Hong Kong Premier League players
Hong Kong First Division League players
FK Rabotnički players
Bangu Atlético Clube players
Macaé Esporte Futebol Clube players
Tarxien Rainbows F.C. players
Expatriate footballers in Hong Kong
Brazilian expatriate sportspeople in Hong Kong
Expatriate footballers in North Macedonia
Expatriate footballers in Malta
Brazilian expatriate sportspeople in Malta
Treze Futebol Clube players
Club Sportivo Sergipe players